Mike Sampson (born 8 August 1945) is a former speedway rider from England.

Speedway career 
Sampson rode in the top tier of British Speedway from 1971 to 1982, riding for multiple clubs. He was a member of the Exeter Falcons team that won the 1974 British League and the White City Rebels team that won the 1977 British League.

References 

Living people
1945 births
British speedway riders
Cradley Heathens riders
Eastbourne Eagles riders
Exeter Falcons riders
Newport Wasps riders
Romford Bombers riders
Stoke Potters riders
West Ham Hammers riders
White City Rebels riders
Sportspeople from Exeter